Little Richmond is an unincorporated community located in the Marsh Township of Surry County, North Carolina.

Geography
The community is centered on the intersection of North Carolina Highway 268 and Joe Layne Mill Road.  Near this intersection are the Little Richmond Baptist Church, founded in 1872, and Little Richmond Cemetery.  Other landmarks in the community include Little Richmond Primitive Baptist Church, New Hope Pentecostal Holiness Church and a C.C. Camp Volunteer Fire Department Substation.  Former landmarks that once stood in this vicinity include the Little Richmond School and a former United States post office called Rusk.

References

External links
 C.C. Camp VFD website

Unincorporated communities in Surry County, North Carolina
Unincorporated communities in North Carolina